Tang Jun-sang (born on August 13, 2003) is a South Korean actor. He gained recognition for his role in the television series Crash Landing on You (2019–20) and leading role in both Move to Heaven (2021) and Racket Boys (2021).

Early life 
Tang was born in Seoul to a Chinese Malaysian father and a South Korean mother, with Tang holding South Korean citizenship after his mother.

Tang will study at the Department of Theater and Film Chung-Ang University.

Career 
Tang made his debut as a musical actor Billy Elliot in 2010 at the age of 7, after which he continued playing in musicals such as Eileigh Seabed, West Pyeonje, KinkyBoots and Assassin.

In 2014, Tang made his drama debut in Pluto Secret Order as Lee Seo Jin and continued to play supporting roles in various movies and dramas.

He gained recognition for his role as Geum Eun Dong – a young North Korean soldier in Crash Landing on You (2019–2020) which became the highest rated tvN drama and the third highest-rated South Korean TV drama in cable television history.

In 2021, Tang starred in Netflix original series Move to Heaven playing the leading role Han Geu-ru, a young man with Asperger syndrome, alongside Lee Je-hoon. In the same year, he played a leading role in the television series Racket Boys for which he received Best Young Actor Award at 2021 SBS Drama Awards.

Filmography

Film

Television series

Web series

Theater

Musical

Theater

Awards and nominations

References

External links 
 
 
 
 

2003 births
Living people
People from Seoul
Male actors from Seoul
21st-century South Korean male actors
South Korean male film actors
South Korean male television actors
South Korean male web series actors
South Korean male child actors
South Korean people of Chinese descent
South Korean people of Malaysian descent